The  is the board of education for Kanagawa Prefecture in Japan. The board consists of six members; one of them is elected as the chair, and one of them is appointed by the board as the superintendent. The board administers municipal education and directly operates all of the prefectural schools.

Schools operated by the Kanagawa Prefectural Board of Education

Cities designated by government ordinance of Japan in Kanagawa Prefecture 

Yokohama (capital city)

Aoba-ku
 
 
 

Asahi-ku

 

Hodogaya-ku

Isogo-ku

Izumi-ku
 
  (formerly Ryokuen Sogo)
 

Kanagawa-ku
 Kanagawa Sohgoh High School

 Yokohama Suiran High School

Kanazawa-ku
 
 

Kohoku-ku
 
 
 

Konan-ku

Midori-ku
 
 

Minami-ku
 
 

Naka-ku
 
 

Nishi-ku
 

Sakae-ku

Seya-ku

Totsuka-ku

Tsurumi-ku
 
 

Tsuzuki-ku

 Kawawa High SchoolKawasaki

Asao-ku
 Asao High School
 Asaosogo High School
 Daishi High School

Kawasaki-ku
 Daishi High School
 Kawasaki High School

Miyamae-ku
 Kawasaki North High School

Nakahara-ku
 Shinjo High School
 Sumiyoshi High School
 Kawasaki Technical High School

Tama-ku
 Ikuta High School
 Ikuta East High School
 Mukainooka Technical High School
 Suge High School
 Kanagawa Prefectural Tama High School
 Yurigaoka High SchoolSagamihara

Chuo-ku
 Kamimizo High School
 Kamimizo South High School
 Sagamihara High School
 Sagamitana High School
 Sagamihara Yaei High School

Midori-ku
 Aihara High School
 Hashimoto High School
 Sagamihara Sogo High School
 Tsukui High School
 Shiroyama High School

Minami-ku
 Asamizodai High School
 Kamitsuruma High School
 Kanagawa Sogo Sangyo High School
 Sagamihara Seiryo High School
 Kanagawa Prefectural Sagamihara Secondary Education School

Other municipalities in Kanagawa Prefecture 

Aikawa
 Aikawa High School

Atsugi
 Atsugi Commercial High School
 Atsugi East High School
 
 Atsugi North High School
 Atsugi Seinan High School
 Atsugi West High School

Ayase
 Ayase High School
 Ayase West High School

Chigasaki
 Chigasaki High School
 Chigasaki Hokuryo High School
 Chigasaki Nishihama High School
 Tsurumine High School

Ebina
 Arima High School
 Central Agricultural High School
 Ebina High School

Fujisawa
 Fujisawa Seiryu High School
 Fujisawa Sogo High School
 Fujisawa Technical High School
 Fujisawa West High School
 Shonandai High School
 

Hadano
 Hadano High School
 Hadano Sogo High School
 Hadano Soya High School

Hiratsuka
 Hiratsuka Agricultural High School
 Hiratsuka Commercial High School
 Hiratsuka High School of Science & Technology
 Kanagawa Prefectural Hiratsuka Konan High School
 Kanagawa Prefectural Hiratsuka Secondary Education School
 Hiratsuka Shofu High School
 Takahama High School

Isehara
 Isehara High School
 Ishida High School

Kaisei
 Yoshidajima Sogo High School

Kamakura
 Fukasawa High School
 
 Ofuna High School
 Shichirigahama High School

Minamiashigara
 Ashigara High School

Miura
 Hiratsuka Agricultural High School Hasse Branch
 Miura Rinkai High School

Ninomiya
 Ninomiya High SchoolOdawara
 Kanagawa Prefectural Odawara High School
 Odawara Johoku Technical High School
 Odawara Sogo Business
 Seisho High School

Oi
 Oi High School

Oiso
 Oiso High School

Samukawa
 Samukawa High School

Shiroyama
 Shiroyama High School

Yamakita
 

Yamato
 Yamato East High School
 Yamato High School
 Yamato South High School
 Yamato West High School

Yokosuka
 Marine Science High School
 Ogusu High School
 Oppama High School
 Tsukuihama High School
 Yokosuka High School
 Yokosuka Meikou High School
 Yokosuka Otsu High School
 Yokosuka Technical High School

Zama
 Sagami Koyokan High School
 Zama High School 
 Zama Sogo High School

Zushi
 Zushi High School
 Zuyo High School

Former schools 
 Kanagawa Prefectural Hibarigaoka High School

See also 
Education in Japan
Secondary education in Japan
Tokyo Metropolitan Government Board of Education
Osaka Prefectural Board of Education
Hokkaidō Prefectural Board of Education
Chiba Prefectural Board of Education
Okinawa Prefectural Board of Education
Iwate Prefectural Board of Education
Ehime Prefectural Board of Education

External links 
  

Kanagawa Prefecture
Prefectural school systems in Japan